Erinnyis obscura, the obscure sphinx, is a moth of the family Sphingidae. The species was first described by Johann Christian Fabricius in 1775.

Distribution 
It lives from the northern part of South America up to the central United States.

Description

Biology 
Adults are on wing year round in the tropics, southern Florida and southern Texas. A single specimen has been added to the Cornell University Insect Collection after being collected by John Dombrowski in Ithaca New York, Tompkins County. The species was identified by curator Jason Dombroeski. This suggests that E. obscura's range is much more northern than expected. [see Cornell Insect Collection Data Base]. 

The caterpillars feed on various members of the family Apocynaceae, including Rauvolfia ligustrina, Rauvolfia tetraphylla, Stemmadenia obovata, Philibertia, Cynanchum and Carica papaya as well as Asclepiadaceae and spurge species, including Blepharodon mucronatum, Funastrum clausum and Morrenia odorata.

Subspecies
Erinnyis obscura obscura (tropical and subtropical lowlands from Uruguay west to Bolivia and Argentina and north through Central America, Mexico, and the West Indies to Florida, Mississippi, Texas, New Mexico, Arizona, and southern California. Strays recorded up to Arkansas, Oklahoma, Nebraska, North Dakota and Pennsylvania)
Erinnyis obscura conformis Rothschild & Jordan, 1903 (Galapagos Islands)
Erinnyis obscura socorroensis Clark, 1926 (Revillagigedo Islands)

References

External links

obscura
Sphingidae of South America
Moths of North America
Lepidoptera of Mexico
Moths described in 1775
Moths of South America
Taxa named by Johan Christian Fabricius